Marina Carrère d'Encausse is a French doctor, author, TV host and broadcaster. She was born in 1962 in Paris. She co-hosts the programme Le Magazine de la santé on France 5 since 2000.

She is the author of books such as Une femme blessée (2014) and Une femme entre deux mondes (2017) published by Anne Carrière. Les Enfants du secret is her third novel.

References

French writers
1962 births
Living people
French people of Georgian descent
Zourabichvili family